The Hoosier was the first steamboat to operate above Willamette Falls on the Willamette River in Oregon. It was built by John Kruse, and owned by John Zumwalt.  James D. Miller worked on this boat and in 1856 became its owner.

References

Books
The Other Side of Oregon, by Ralph Friedman p. 378, Caxton Printers, Caldwell, ID 1993

Steamboats of the Willamette River
Paddle steamers of Oregon
Passenger ships of the United States
Ships built in Oregon
1851 ships
Oregon Territory